Christopher Nash (born 17 November 1952) is a Bermudian sailor. He participated at the 1984 Summer Olympics in Los Angeles, where he placed fifth in the multihull class, together with Alan Burland.

References

External links 
 

1952 births
Living people
Bermudian male sailors (sport)
Olympic sailors of Bermuda
Sailors at the 1984 Summer Olympics – Tornado